For information on the wildlife of Palau, see:
List of birds of Palau
List of mammals of Palau

Lists of biota of Palau
Palau

Fish
There are 1,546 observed species of native and introduced fish of Palau, both off the coast in saltwater and some species found in freshwater. 

A few examples include: 
Frogfish
Sweetlips
Napoleon wrasse
Wrasses
Shortfin mako
Barred moray
Seahorses
Pelagic thresher

References